Karbi Youth Festival is an annual festival celebrated by the Karbi People living in East and West Karbi Anglong district and other districts in the Northeast Indian state of Assam, with occasional participation from other tribes and states of Northeastern India. It is considered the oldest ethnic festival in India. It is organised by Karbi Cultural Society (KCS). It is locally known as Karbi Riso-Nimso Rong Aje.

Yearly festival
The main event is held/celebrated on 15–19 February of every year in Karbi Peoples Hall (KPH), Taralangso situated in Diphu town in Karbi Anglong district of the Indian state of Assam.

Zonal festivals
Smaller festivals called Zonal Karbi Youth Festival (ZKYF) are also celebrated in their respective regions, during late autumn, before coming together for main cultural events cum yearly festival at Taralangso, Diphu.

Gallery

References

External links
 Karbi Youth Festival 2021 (Everything You Need To Know About)

Festivals in Assam
Tourism in Northeast India
February events
Karbi Anglong district